The 6th Infantry Brigade was a regular infantry brigade of the British Army that was in existence during the Second Boer War,  the First World War and the Second World War and later formed part of British Army of the Rhine.

History

Second Boer War 
The brigade was a part of the Natal Field Force under the command of Major General Sir Geoffrey Barton.  It was composed as follows;

2nd Battalion, Royal Fusiliers (4 companies)
2nd Battalion, Royal Scots Fusiliers
1st Battalion, Royal Welsh Fusiliers
2nd Battalion, Royal Irish Fusiliers

Following the end of the Boer war in 1902 the army was restructured, and a 3rd Infantry division was established permanently at Bordon as part of the 1st Army Corps, comprising the 5th and 6th Infantry Brigades.

First World War 
The brigade was part of 2nd Division. The brigade commanded the following units in the First World War:

1st Battalion, King's (Liverpool Regiment)
2nd Battalion, South Staffordshire Regiment
13th (Service) Battalion (West Ham), Essex Regiment
17th (Service) Battalion, Middlesex Regiment, (the Football Battalion).
1st Battalion, King's Royal Rifle Corps (to 99th Bde. December 1915)

The following battalions were part of the brigade during 1915.
1st Battalion, Royal Berkshire Regiment (August 1914 to December 1915)
1/5th Battalion, King's (Liverpool Regiment) (February 1915 to December 1915)
1/7th Battalion, King's (Liverpool Regiment) (March 1915 to September 1915)
1/1st Battalion, Hertfordshire Regiment (August 1915 to June 1916)

The 17th Battalion of the Royal Fusiliers joined the brigade from
the 5th Brigade in February 1918.

Second World War

At the outbreak of the Second World War, in September 1939, the 6th Infantry Brigade was part of the 2nd Infantry Division. In October, the brigade, under the command of Brigadier Noel Irwin, moved with the rest of the division to France to become part of the British Expeditionary Force (BEF). The brigade was involved in the short Battle of France fighting at the Battles of The Dyle, St Omer-La Bassée and the retreat to and evacuation from Dunkirk in May–June 1940. With the invasion of Burma by the Imperial Japanese Army in early 1942 the brigade was shipped out to India with the 2nd Division where it would remain for the rest of the war, fighting in the Burma Campaign. It fought in the Arakan and at Kohima and Mandalay.

Order of battle
The brigade was composed as follows;
1st Battalion, Royal Berkshire Regiment (9 September 1939 - 31 August 1945)
1st Battalion, Royal Welch Fusiliers (9 September 1939 - 31 August 1945)
2nd Battalion, Durham Light Infantry (3 September 1939 - 9 September 1941, 19 October 1941 - 31 August 1945)
1st Battalion, East Lancashire Regiment (9 September 1941 - 19 October 1941)
6th Infantry Brigade Anti-Tank Company (9 September 1939 - 14 December 1940)

While an Independent Brigade Group fighting in the Arakan between 1 November 1942 and 2 June 1943, the following additional units were attached:
1st Battalion, Royal Scots
99th (Buckinghamshire Yeomanry) Field Regiment, Royal Artillery
506th Field Company Royal Engineers
6th Field Ambulance Royal Army Medical Corps

Post-war
The brigade was reformed from 153rd Infantry Brigade in 1947 and then formed part of British Army of the Rhine being based at St Sebastian Barracks in Soest in 1952. 

During the 1970s, the brigade was one of two "square" brigades assigned to 3rd Armoured Division. After being briefly converted to "Task Force Foxtrot" in the late 1970s, the brigade was reinstated in 1981, assigned to 3rd Armoured Division and was then was reformed as an airmobile brigade at Salamanca Barracks in Soest from 1986 to 1988 and then reformed again as an armoured brigade from 1988 to 1992.

Notes

References

External links

Infantry brigades of the British Army in World War II
Infantry brigades of the British Army in World War I
Military units and formations in Burma in World War II